Palmen is a surname. Notable persons with that name include:

 Annie Palmen (1926–2000), Dutch singer
 Connie Palmen (born 1955), Dutch author
 Erik Palmén (1898–1985), Finnish meteorologist
 Manfred Palmen (1945-2022), German politician

See also
 16168 Palmen, a minor planet
 Palme (surname)

de:Palmen (Begriffsklärung)